Tajanak may refer to:
 Tajanak, Amol
 Tajanak, Babol
 Tajanak-e Olya, Sari County
 Tajanak-e Sofla, Sari County